Desert Magazine was a monthly regional publication based in the Colorado Desert published between 1937 and 1985. A print version bearing the same name has been revived in the Coachella Valley town of Palm Desert near Palm Springs, California.

History

Editors 
Desert Magazine was founded, edited and published from 1937 to 1958 by Randall Henderson (1888–1970). New editors followed until the magazine closed print publication in 1985. It was revived as an on-line magazine in 2006.

Publication
The magazine focused on the desert country of the Southwestern United States and Northwestern Mexico, and covered a broad range of desert subjects including: regional travel and exploration; the visual arts of painting, drawing, and photography; prose and literature; cultural history; prospecting and mining; natural history including geology, wildlife, and flora; river running, and lifestyle–human interest stories.

Online magazine – revival 
Desert Magazine was revived as an archival online magazine, the Desert Magazine e-zine journal, in 2006. It contains all the entries and illustrations that were published in print from 1937 to 1985. A newsblog is also produced about the magazine called the Desert Magazine Weblog.

Others 
Desert Magazine is also the name of a monthly desert lifestyles magazine sent to subscribers to the Palm Springs daily newspaper The Desert Sun.

See also
 Calico Print
 Desert Rat Scrap Book
 Desert Star Weekly – a weekly Coachella Valley newspaper published in Desert Hot Springs
 Jimmy Swinnerton – featured artist in magazine

References

Further reading
 
 
 
  
 
  – South wrote a series of highly popular "Desert Refuge" articles (1940–1946) about his primitive life on the desert

External links
 
 
Desert Magazine archives (1937-1951) at the University of Arizona Campus Repository

Lifestyle magazines published in the United States
Monthly magazines published in the United States
Online magazines published in the United States
Chihuahuan Desert
Colorado Desert
Defunct magazines published in the United States
History of the American West
History of the Mojave Desert region
History of Southern California
Magazines established in 1937
Magazines disestablished in 1985
Magazines published in California
Magazines published in Colorado
Mass media in Riverside County, California
Online magazines with defunct print editions
Sonoran Desert